Chamba House is an Anglo-Mughal building in Lahore, Pakistan. It is now being used as a guest house by the Government of Pakistan and is maintained by Pakistan Public Works Department.

History
It was commissioned by His Highness the Raja Saheb Bahadur of Chamba. It was designed by Bhai Ram Singh.

References 

Buildings and structures in Lahore
Tourist attractions in Lahore